Hog plum is a common name for several plants that produce edible fruit, and may refer to:
Species of the genus Spondias
Spondias dulcis
Spondias mombin
Spondias pinnata
Species of the genus Colubrina
Prunus rivularis
Prunus umbellata
Ximenia americana